The Palm Centro is a smartphone marketed by Palm, Inc. beginning its release on October 14, 2007 offering the functionality of the larger Treo 755p in a smaller size.

The Centro is one of the last devices to run the Palm OS operating system. The successor to Palm OS is webOS, which debuted on the Palm Pre in June 2009.

Currently, the Centro still works with some carriers, but not with others. 2G GSM devices, such as the AT&T Centro, can no longer connect to the AT&T network. Once Verizon's 3G network is shut down, Verizon Centro devices will only work offline.

Specifications
With a weight of 119 g, and dimensions of 4.2″ (h), 2.1″ (w) and 0.7″ (d), the Centro was the smallest-ever Palm smartphone at the time of its introduction. It includes a 1.3-megapixel digital camera with video capture capabilities, microSD card slot (officially supporting up to 8 GB microSD cards, though in practice, microSD cards up to 64 GB work), touch screen navigation and a QWERTY keyboard. The phone is available with either CDMA technology supporting EVDO Rev 0 for network access, or GSM. The stock battery allows for up to 3.5 hours of continuous talk time. The phone also offers internet connection tethering to laptop or desktop computers.

An AC travel charger and a USB data cable are Included with the phone.

Palm has more recently upgraded the available memory from 64 MB to 128 MB, but the updated models were available only with Sprint.

The Palm Centro also had support for (Java) MIDP 2.0, though Palm has discontinued distributing it for licensing reasons.

The product SKU on this model was PTR690HK, which is aligned with products in the Trēo family of Palm smartphones. The Verizon Wireless SKU was CENTRO690P.

Operating system
The Centro runs Palm OS 5.4.9. Because of the backward compatibility features included in Palm OS, most applications released for older Palm devices also work with the Centro.

Carriers

Sprint
Sprint marketed the original Centro in red, black and pink.

In October 2008, it released the second-generation Centro in two new colors, Olive Green and Vibrant Rose. The new model has twice as much user-accessible storage as the preceding model. It also features a rubberized soft-touch coating.

AT&T
The AT&T version is available in black, white and electric blue. It uses the GSM cellular network for connectivity and does have some differences from Sprint's CDMA version. The GSM-based device is quad-band (850/900/1800/1900 MHz) and supports both GPRS and EDGE data protocols. Even though the Sprint and Verizon versions of the Centro support 3G (EV-DO), the AT&T version does not; it is a 2G-only device.

PC Magazine writes: "The Centro for AT&T sacrifices the Sprint version's high-speed data access, but you get more battery life—though not quite enough. Nonetheless, the low price makes it a good first smartphone."

The AT&T Centro also offers a Push-To-Talk walkie-talkie-like service not available on the CDMA device. This allows you to instantly see the availability of your contacts before calling them and make individual or group Push-To-Talk calls.

Verizon
The Verizon version of the Centro, available in dark blue only, was released on June 12, 2008 for $99 with a two-year contract and a $70 mail in rebate. This version runs on a 1xRTT/1xEV–DO (Rel. 0) 3G network.

Claro

Claro introduced the Centro to the Brazilian market by the beginning of 2008.

Telstra
Telstra Australia has seen the Centro offered via prepaid only.
Good Gear Guide writes: "The first smartphone with a full QWERTY keyboard to be sold in Australia on pre-paid". The device is white; but, unlike the green number pad seen on AT&T's Centro, this version has a grey number pad.

Rogers Wireless

Rogers Wireless (Canada) announced that it would be carrying the Palm Centro as of June 10, 2008. It is available only in dark blue. For new activations on a three-year $45+ plan, the Centro initially sold for $299.99. For renewals on any three-year voice-and-data plan, it sold for $199.99.

Unlocked GSM

On June 25, 2008, an Unlocked GSM version of the Centro was released for use on all 850/900/1800/1900 MHz GSM telephone networks. It is available in Glacier White with grey keyboard accents.

Bell Mobility

As of February 2, 2009, a CDMA version of the Palm Centro in Midnight Black was released on the Bell Mobility network. The phone sold for $49.95 with a new activation on a 3-year $45+ voice and data package. This version of the Centro runs on a 1xRTT/1xEV–DO (Rel. 0) 3G network.

Popularity
As of August 2008, the Palm Centro was the second-ranked US smartphone based on internet traffic, responsible for 78% of the traffic on Palm devices; it fell to fourth in February 2009, responsible for 86% of Palm traffic.

Advertising
In December 2008, Palm created a holiday advertising campaign, introducing a new version of Santa Claus, called "Claus", and complemented the TV spots with a Facebook pageFacebook, viral videos and original music in download form.

References

External links
 Palm Centro for Sprint specifications (PDF)

Mobile phones introduced in 2007
Centro
Palm OS devices
Smartphones
Mobile phones with an integrated hardware keyboard